Liuhe is a county of southwestern Jilin province, China, bordering Liaoning province to the southwest.

Administrative divisions
There are 11 towns, one ethnic town, and three townships.

Climate

References

 
County-level divisions of Jilin